Kolangaran (also Romanized as Kolangarān) is a village in Lafmejan Rural District, in the Central District of Lahijan County, Gilan Province, Iran. At the 2006 census, its population was 239, in 84 families.

References 

Populated places in Lahijan County